Sommerfelt is a Norwegian surname. Notable people with the surname include:

 Aimée Sommerfelt (1892–1975), Norwegian children's books author
 Alf Sommerfelt (1892–1965), Norwegian linguist
 Ole Hannibal Sommerfelt (1753–1821), Norwegian jurist, civil servant, and topographer

See also
 Sommerfeld (disambiguation)

Norwegian-language surnames